Maroczy may refer to:
Géza Maróczy, Hungarian chess grandmaster
Maróczy Bind, a chess pawn formation named after Géza Maróczy